Emily Fleeshman (born 26 December 1986) is an English actress. She is most widely known for her roles as Nikki in Still Open All Hours and Sally in Moving On.

She is the daughter of actor David Fleeshman and actress Sue Jenkins, the sister of actor Richard Fleeshman and actress Rosie Fleeshman.

Along with her parents, she is a founder of The Actors' Lab, an acting school based at MediaCityUK, Salford. and a patron of the 24:7 Theatre Festival.
In 2016, she was announced as an E3 Business Awards North West finalist for the Young Entrepreneur of the Year Award in recognition of her achievements with the Actors'Lab.

Career
Emily Fleeshman made her debut at the Manchester Central Library theatre aged 11, is a former member of Youth Unlimited Theatre Group and attended Cheadle Hulme School in Cheshire. She studied for a degree in Theatre Studies at Lancaster University.

She has appeared in several television and radio series, and a short film and with regularity in the BBC One sitcom, Still Open All Hours, as Nikki.
She is the third member of the family to appear in The Royal following her mother and father. Her father, mother and brother have all appeared in Coronation Street.

Theatre credits include: Tinker Bell in Peter Pan at The Lowry, Salford, Rita, Sue and Bob Too (play) at the Theatre Royal, St Helens, The Crimson Retribution as part of the 24:7 Theatre festival, Once in a House on Fire at The Lowry, Salford. and JB Shorts 8 & 14, Real Life Theatre Company Manchester.

Television series

References

External links
 
 Emily Fleeshman official website

1986 births
Living people
21st-century English actresses
English television actresses
People from Withington